The 2012–13 Senior Women's Challenger Trophy was the fourth edition of India's 50 over Women's Challenger Trophy. Three teams made up of the best players in India competed in a round-robin group, with the top two advancing to the final. All matches were held at the Bandra Kurla Complex Ground, Mumbai across four days in December 2012. The tournament was won by India Blue, who beat India Red in the final by 60 runs. The other team in the tournament, India Green , were newly made an Under-19s team for this tournament.

Competition format
The three teams played in a round-robin group, playing each other team once, with the top two advancing to the final. Matches were played using a 50 over format.

The group worked on a points system with positions with the group being based on the total points. Points were awarded as follows:

Win: 4 points. 
Tie: 2 points. 
Loss: 0 points.
No Result/Abandoned: 2 points.

If points in the final table are equal, teams are separated by their Net Run Rate.

Squads

Standings

Source: ESPN Cricinfo

Group stage

Final

Statistics

Most runs

Source: CricketArchive

Most wickets

Source: CricketArchive

References

External links
 Series home at ESPN Cricinfo

2012–13 Indian women's cricket
2012-13
Domestic cricket competitions in 2012–13
Senior Women's Challenger Trophy